Westwood Heights School District is a public school district in Genesee County in the U.S. state of Michigan and in the Genesee Intermediate School District.

High school

Hamady High School is a public high school in the Westwood Heights School District in Mount Morris Township, just outside Flint, Michigan.

Elementary school

Colonel Donald McMonagle Elementary is a public elementary school in the Westwood Heights School District in Mount Morris Township, just outside Flint, Michigan. It was previously Westwood Elementary. In 2007, Westwood Elementary was renovated and merged with Hamady Elementary to form one elementary school. The newly renovated elementary school was named after a former graduate of Westwood Heights Schools. Colonel Donald McMonagle graduated from Hamady High School in 1970. He became a NASA astronaut in June 1987.

Athletics

The official mascot of Hamady High School is the hawk. The school colors are blue and white. Hamady is considered a class C school according to the Michigan High School Athletics Association. In 2009, the girls basketball team won the MHSAA Class C Championship, and also won another in 2010.

The Varsity Coach of the Hamady Hawks has been Archie (also spelled Archy) Robinson, who was a 13th Round Draft pick in 1972 for the Miami Dolphins. He teaches at Hamady as well.

References

External links
 hamadyhawks.net
 Public School Districts map
Flint Hamady Hawks historical football scores

School districts in Michigan
Education in Genesee County, Michigan